The 2014 Missouri Valley Conference men's soccer season was the 24th season of men's varsity soccer in the conference. The defending regular season champion was Missouri State, and the defending postseason champion was Bradley.

Missouri State won the regular season championship .

The Missouri Valley Conference men's soccer tournament was hosted by Bradley on November 12, 14, and 16. SIUE won the tourney title and the automatic bid to the 2014 NCAA Division I Men's Soccer Championship with a 1–0 victory over Missouri State in the second extra time period.

In the NCAA Tournament, the SIUE Cougars defeated Northwestern 1–0 in Evanston before falling in the second round to #15 seed California 0–1 in Berkeley.

Changes from 2013 
 None

Teams

Season outlook 
2014 Preseason Coaches' Poll

2014 Preseason MVC All-Conference Team

MVC Tournament 
Source:

Honors
Sources:

2014 NSCAA Men's University Division Scholar All-America Teams
First Team— Defender Matt Polster, SIUE, 3.46 Business Administration, Las Vegas, NV

Second Team— Defender James Fawke, Missouri State, 3.45 Administrative Management, Cheltenham, England

2014 NSCAA/Continental Tire NCAA Division I Men's All-West Region Teams
First Team— Defender Matt Polster, SIUE; Midfielder Christian Volesky, SIUE

Second Team— Defender James Fawke, Missouri State; Defender Eric Schoendorf, Loyola; Forward Mark Anthony Gonzalez, Evansville

Third Team— Goalkeeper Tim Dobrowolski, Loyola; Defender Parker Maher, Missouri State; Forward Cody Lofgren, Bradley; Forward Christian Okeke, Bradley

2014 MVC awards
2014 MVC Player of the Year — Christian Volesky, SIUE

2014 MVC Defensive Player of the Year — Matt Polster, SIUE

2014 MVC Goalkeeper of the Year — Tim Dobrowolski, Loyola

2014 MVC Freshman of the Year — Kyle Thomson, Loyola

2014 MVC Coaching Staff of the Year — Loyola (Neil Jones, Nate Boyden, Brian Plotkin, Jeremy Proud)

2014 MVC Fair Play Award— Evansville

2014 MVC All-Conference First Team

2014 MVC All-Conference Second Team

2014 MVC All-Freshman Team

2014 MVC All-Tournament Team
2014 Missouri Valley Conference Men's Soccer Tournament MVP— Jabari Danzy, SIUE

2014 MVC Men's Soccer Scholar-Athlete Team

References

 
Missouri Valley Conference
2014 NCAA Division I men's soccer season